The Congregation of Holy Cross abbreviated CSC is a Catholic clerical religious congregation of pontifical right for men founded in 1837 by Basil Moreau, in Le Mans, France.

Moreau also founded the Marianites of Holy Cross for women, now divided into three independent congregations of sisters: the Marianites of Holy Cross (Le Mans, France), the Sisters of the Holy Cross (Notre Dame, Indiana), and the Sisters of Holy Cross (Montreal, Quebec, Canada).

History

Two Societies
Basile Antoine-Marie Moreau was born at Laigné-en-Belin, near Le Mans, France, on February 11, 1799, in the final months of the French Revolution. When Moreau decided to enter the priesthood, he was forced to undergo his seminary training in secret for fear that the French government would arrest him. He completed his studies and was ordained for the Diocese of Le Mans in 1821. The French government continued to work for the removal of the Church from the educational system, which left many Catholics without a place to be educated or catechized. In 1835,  Moreau had formed a group, which he called "Auxiliary Priests", to serve the educational and evangelization needs of the Diocese of Le Mans.

On July 15, 1820, a priest of the Diocese of Le Mans, Jacques-Francois Dujarié, brought together a group of zealous men to serve the educational needs of the people in the French countryside. Fr. Dujarié named this group the Brothers of St. Joseph. By 1835 this group was well established in the diocese, but Dujarié was getting older and they were in need of a new leader. Dujarié and Moreau had met previously and discussed their views on the future of the Church in France and so Dujarié knew that Moreau was just the man he was looking for. With the consent of the bishop, Moreau was given control of the Brothers of St. Joseph on August 31, 1835. He was now the head of two organizations, the Auxiliary Priests and the Brothers of St. Joseph.

The Association of Holy Cross
In 1837, Moreau made the decision to combine his two communities into one society so that the priests and brothers could share resources and ministries in common. On March 1, 1837, the priests and brothers gathered in the church of Notre-Dame de Sainte-Croix, Le Mans in the Sainte-Croix district of Le Mans to sign the Fundamental Act of Union which legally joined them into one association. This new group took on the name of where they met and became the Association of Holy Cross. Initially Holy Cross was a diocesan group and so they primarily served in whatever capacity the bishop asked of them. In 1840 this changed when Moreau received a request to send a delegation from his society to Algeria with the purpose of establishing schools and a seminary. It was at this point that Moreau shifted the focus of Holy Cross and after the first missionaries left in April 1840 the association took on the identity of a religious institute. On August 15, 1840, Moreau and four others became the first professed religious in the Association of Holy Cross. As part of his plan to form this religious institute, Moreau also brought together the first group of women who would become the Marianites of Holy Cross.

In 1841 he sent a group to the United States, establishing the first Holy Cross institution in North America at Notre Dame, Indiana. The institute expanded further by establishing missions in Canada in 1847 and in East Bengal in 1852.

This association of priests, brothers, and sisters, would continue in roughly the same form until May 13, 1857, when Pope Pius IX approved the first constitutions of the priests and brothers. From that point on the Association officially became the Congregation of Holy Cross. Doubting the propriety of a mixed congregation of men and women, Rome separated the women into an independent community at that time. Moreau, in his role as their founder, continued to work for Rome's approval of the sisters' constitution. In 1865, Rome approved the constitutions of the Marianites of Holy Cross, granting them the status of an Apostolic congregation.

Holy Cross and The Holy Family

Moreau saw a visible image of the Holy Family in this Congregation of Holy Cross which he had conceived as an association of religious men and women working together on equal footing for the building of the reign of God. He intended that this Congregation, composed at its origins of three distinct Societies, namely, Sisters, Priests, and Brothers, be an apostolic institute. Calling on the spiritual aid of Jesus, Mary, and Joseph, Moreau gave to each of the three groups a patron: he consecrated the priests to the Sacred Heart of Jesus; he consecrated the brothers to the pure heart of St. Joseph; and he consecrated the sisters to the Immaculate Heart of Mary. He also established Mary, under her title of Our Lady of Sorrows, as special patroness for all of Holy Cross, whose members in their several congregations continue to cherish these devotions. As Moreau stated in one of his letters, he envisioned that: “Holy Cross will grow like a mighty tree and constantly shoot forth new limbs and new branches which will be nourished by the same sap and endowed with the same life.”

Superiors General
Fr. Basil Moreau, CSC (1837–1866)
Most Rev. Pierre Dufal, CSC (1866–1868)
 Fr. Edward Sorin, CSC (1868–1893)
Fr. Gilbert Francais, CSC (1893-1926?)
Fr. James Wesley Donahue, CSC (1926–1938)
Fr. Albert Cousineau, CSC (1938–1950)
Fr. Christopher O'Toole, CSC (1950–1962)
Fr. Germain-Marie Lalande, CSC (1962–1974)
Fr. Tom Barrosse, CSC (1974–1986)
Fr. Claude Grou, CSC (1986–1998)
Fr. Hugh Cleary, CSC (1998–2010)
Fr. Richard Warner, CSC (2010–2016)
Fr. Robert Epping, CSC (2016–2022)
Br. Paul Bednarczyk, CSC (2022–present)

Provinces, Districts, and Vicariates
United States Province of Priests and Brothers (USA)
District of Chile-Peru
District of East Africa
Midwest Province of Brothers (USA)
District of West Africa
Province canadienne de la Congrégation de Sainte-Croix (Canada)
District of Acadia
Moreau Province of Brothers and Priests (USA)
District of Brazil
Province of South India
Sacred Heart of Jesus Province (Bangladesh)
St. Joseph Province (Bangladesh)
Province Notre-Dame du Perpétuel Secours (Haiti)
Province of North East India
Vicariate of France
Vicariate of English Canada
Vicariate of India
Vicariate of Tamil Nadu, India

Notable members

Saints & Blesseds
Saint André Bessette, CSC, "Miracle Man of Montreal" & the institute's first recognized Saint
Blessed Basil Moreau, CSC, Founder of the Congregation

Members of the Hierarchy
Bishop Arthur "Bud" Colgan, CSC, Auxiliary Bishop of Chosica (Peru), Titular Bishop of Ampora
Archbishop Patrick Cardinal D'Rozario, CSC, Archbishop of Dhaka, Bangladesh
Bishop George Joseph Finnigan, CSC, Third Bishop of the Diocese of Helena in the state of Montana.
Servant of God Archbishop Theotonius Amal Ganguly, CSC, second Archbishop of Dhaka
Bishop Daniel R. Jenky, CSC, Bishop of Peoria, IL
Bishop Jorge Izaguirre Rafael, CSC, Prelate of Chuquibamba, Peru
Servant of God Bishop Vincent J. McCauley, CSC, First Bishop of Fort Portal, Uganda
Archbishop Marcos G. McGrath, CSC, former Archbishop of Panamá (1969-1994)
Bishop Lumen Monteiro, CSC, First Bishop of Agartala
John Francis Cardinal O'Hara, CSC, President of Notre Dame (1934–1939) and Archbishop of Philadelphia (1951–1960)
Bishop Yves-Marie Péan, CSC., Bishop of Les Gonaïves, Haiti.
Bishop Stephen Rotluanga, CSC, Bishop of Aizawl
Archbishop Charles Asa Schleck, CSC, Titular Archbishop of Africa
Bishop William Albert Wack, CSC, Bishop of Diocese of Pensacola–Tallahassee
Bishop Paul E. Waldschmidt, CSC, President of the University of Portland (1962–1978) and Auxiliary Bishop of Portland (1978–1994)
Bishop Patrick Neary, CSC, Bishop of Roman Catholic Diocese of Saint Cloud

Others
Fr. Gerald Fitzgerald, s.P., founder of The Congregation of the Servants of the Paraclete
Servant of God Br. Flavian LaPlante, CSC, Missionary
Fr. Julius Nieuwland, CSC, Professor and Inventor
Venerable Fr. Patrick Peyton, CSC, "The Rosary Priest"
Fr. John Zahm, CSC, Scientist and Explorer
Fr. Richard William Timm, CSC, Missionary, Educator, Zoologist, and Development Worker.

Location
Holy Cross Priests and Brothers can be found across the globe, including these countries (date of first appearance in parentheses):

 France (1820)
 United States (1841)
 Chile (1943)
 Haiti (1944)

 Canada (1847)
 Italy (1850)
 Bangladesh (1853)
 India (1853)

 Ghana (1957)
 Brazil (1958)
 Uganda (1958)
 Peru (1961)

 Kenya (195-)
 Liberia (1950s?)
 Tanzania (2003)

Foreign Missions

The Mission of Holy Cross in Bangladesh
The first group of Holy Cross missionaries to reach India left England January 17, 1853. It was composed of three brothers, three sisters, one priest and one seminarian. (Two priests dropped out due to severe illness when the first attempt to sail in November 1852 failed due to storms.) The group arrived in Calcutta in May 1853. Fr. Verite took the sisters to Dhaka, while the brothers and seminarian went to Noakhali. Fr. Verite soon joined them as pastor of Noakhali, which included Agartala and Sylhet in its territory. Chittagong became the headquarters of Holy Cross in December 1853.

The East Bengal mission was called at the time, “unquestionably the most destitute in East Asia and perhaps in any other part of the world.” Because it was such a difficult and dangerous place to live and work, no other religious congregation showed any interest in it. Though the mission was named East Bengal, the Church jurisdiction and the political territory or civil jurisdiction called East Bengal were quite different from each other. The Province of East Bengal was first created in 1905. The Church territory was officially called the Vicariate of East Bengal, set up in 1845 by the Sacred Congregation for the Propagation of the Faith at the Vatican. Its first superior was Bishop Thomas Olliffe, an Irish Jesuit. The Vicariate of East Bengal embraced the present-day Archdiocese of Dhaka, Diocese of Mymensingh, and Diocese of Chittagong, as well as a large part of Assam, the Arakan district (former name of the Rakhine State of western Burma, and the Diocese of Agartala in eastern India. It was a huge area, but when Holy Cross arrived in 1853, there were only three priests working there - a Portuguese Augustinian and two young Irish diocesan priests, both of whom were dead of disease by 1854. There were about 13,000 Catholics in the area. In Dhaka, there was no church or chapel at all under the jurisdiction of Rome.

The Mission of Holy Cross in Chile
The District of Chile is the longest-running mission still overseen by the United States Province. Three Holy Cross religious arrived in Santiago, Chile, on March 1, 1943, at the invitation of Cardinal José María Caro, Archbishop of Santiago (Chile), to administer Saint George's College. Fathers William Havey, Alfred Send, and Joseph Dougherty believed they were going to do university work. Little did they know that “college” in this context meant a school of first through 12th graders.

Today, Saint George's College serves 2,650 students. Its history is rich and is closely tied with the history of Chile, including the 1970s when the school was taken over by the military government and Holy Cross was ousted. The Congregation returned to the school in 1986.  Strong faith formation and service have been a hallmark of Saint George's. Over the decades, the college has formed many influential leaders in Chilean society. Also Holy Cross’ first Chilean vocation, Fr. Jorge Canepa, was a 1946 graduate of the school.

Additionally, the District administers Colegio Nuestra Señora de Andacollo, located in the older sector of Central Santiago. The Congregation took responsibility for the school in the 1970s, after its expulsion from Saint George's. The student body, numbering 1,100, is made up primarily of children from working-class families. With improvements to the physical plant and the strong Holy Cross commitment, the school has been able to reach new heights academically.

From the beginning, the mission of Holy Cross in Chile also included parish ministry and social service. Within three years of arriving, the Congregation had begun both its ministry at San Roque, a parish in the sector of Penalolen in Santiago, as well as its outreach to abandoned children in Santiago and later in Talagante.  Today, the District administers two parishes in addition to San Roque: Nuestra Señora de Andacollo, in the same area as the school; and Nuestra Señora de la Merced, in Calle Larga, in the Diocese of San Felipe. The parishes are known for their youth ministry and social justice work. Then through Fundamor and Fundación Moreau, the District continues its work with abandoned children. Currently there are approximately 50 children in residence, ages 4 to 18. There is also a new prevention program ministering to 100 children that has been recognized as the first of its kind in Chile.

The Mission of Holy Cross in Mexico
Initially the members of the Congregation of Holy Cross were sent to Mexico from Texas.
In 1972, Fr. Frederick Schmidt, CSC, was sent to Mexico for a "sabbatical" by Fr. Christopher O'Toole, CSC, the Provincial of the Southern Province at the time. In 1973 Fr. Fred assumed the pastoral responsibility for a large parish in Ahuacatlan, San Luis Potosí, Nuestro Padre Jesús. He served as pastor for 25 years. In 1998 when Fr. Francisco Garcia, a priest from the Diocese of Ciudad Valles, was appointed pastor, Fr. Fred became the pastor emeritus. When Fr. Schmidt died in 2003, he was buried at the parish in the crypt of the convent church that he helped build. With his death, Holy Cross withdrew from this parish, although one of its members has become a Holy Cross priest. The relationship with the parish and pastor continues to be one of friendship and Holy Cross offers occasional assistance.

In 1987, the Southern Province assumed the responsibility for the pastoral care of Santo Tomas Moro parish in the Archdiocese of Monterrey, Nuevo León. The parish grew dramatically and eventually gave birth to a new parish, Nuestra Madre Santisima de La Luz. Holy Cross opted to shift from Santo Tomas Moro to this new parish with greater needs. Holy Cross continues to serve this community.

In 1993 the Southern Province founded a program of vocation promotion and initial formation for young Mexican men who believe they are called to religious life and priesthood in Holy Cross. The Southern Province established a program for postulants and a program for professed seminarians. The novitiate for the formation program is in Peru.

In 1999, Holy Cross Family Ministries founded Family Rosary in México. Their offices and meeting rooms are located in an Archdiocesan pastoral center in San Francisco Javier parish, close to La Luz parish in the Archdiocese of Monterrey. Their offices serve as a "hub" for the growing Holy Cross apostolate of fostering family prayer, especially the rosary, as well as devotion to Mary throughout Mexico.

In 2000, the local Holy Cross community in Monterrey established an immersion program at La Luz parish. This program provides an intercultural experience of life and ministry with and for the poor. It is offered principally to students from Holy Cross universities, high schools, and parishes in the United States. One group of Chilean laywomen also participated. The program has been temporarily suspended due to the wave of violence in Mexico.

In 2010, Fr. Marín Hernández, CSC, and Fr. Paulino Antonio, CSC, the first two Mexicans to be ordained as Holy Cross priests, were assigned to Parroquia San José in Tamán, San Luis Potosí. The Bishop of the Diocese of Ciudad Valles offered this parish to Holy Cross in part because of the indigenous community's need for pastoral care and evangelization. Frs. Hernández and Antonio speak Nahuatl, the language of the people, and Fr. Antonio comes from this indigenous group.

In 2011 the Holy Cross community in Mexico became a part of the newly formed U.S. Province of Priests and Brothers.

The Mission of Holy Cross in Peru
The mission of Holy Cross in Peru began with an exhortation of Pope John XXIII to religious orders to send missionaries to Latin America, and Holy Cross arrived in the north of Peru in Cartavio in September 1963. The presence soon included Chimbote in the early 1960s and expanded for a time to Puno and Tacna, on the border of Bolivia and Chile, and finally came to develop an organized presence and pastoral strategy in the Diocese of Chosica.  The parish, El Señor de la Esperanza, is about the size of a small diocese in the U.S. Approximately 250,000 Catholics live in a parish that has 19 chapels. In 1982, within the boundaries of Lord of Hope Parish in Canto Grande, the Congregation established “Yancana Huasy” (literally “House of Work” in the language of the Incas). Yancana Huasy attends to the needs of children who live with physical and mental challenges, including Downs’ Syndrome, and their families.

The Mission of Holy Cross in Uganda
In November 1958, four Holy Cross priests arrived in Entebbe, Uganda to begin their ministry. The dioceses of Toro and Bunyoro were too large for the bishop to handle. He granted Holy Cross permission to minister to the people of Fort Portal and Butiti. Soon thereafter Holy Cross began administrating St. Leo's College, a high school in Kyegobe, Fort Portal diocese. Near Christmas of 1960, Holy Cross began its first parish at Bukwali. Around the end of February 1961, Cardinal Agaginian, the Armenian Patriarch at the time, told Fr. Christopher O'Toole, CSC, the superior general of Holy Cross, that missionary Vincent J. McCauley was to be made Bishop of Fort Portal. In 1967, a house, and later novitiate (in 1984), was built on the shores of Lake Saaka in Fort Portal. During the military dictatorship of Idi Amin, the Congregation decided at one point to leave the Diocese of Fort Portal. This proposal was later abandoned. Bishop McCauley died on November 1, 1982.

By 1962, the institute had begun accepting Ugandan religious aspirants to the community. Along with other religious institutes, they began a seminary in Kenya called Tangaza in 1986. By 1989, Holy Cross and a consortium of religious congregations and societies established the Queen of Apostles Philosophy Centre in the Roman Catholic Diocese of Jinja ("PCJ") due largely to the political crises between Kenya and Uganda. It was then difficult for Ugandans to study at Tangaza. PCJ was to be a seminary for philosophical and religious studies for these (mostly Ugandan) postulants.

On August 17, 1991, Holy Cross ordained its first Ugandan priest, Fr. Fulgens Katende. Five Holy Cross Brother's and one priest died in the genocide of 1994. In Bugembe and Wanyange, two villages of the Jinja Diocese, a primary school and secondary were opened: Holy Cross Primary and Holy Cross Lakeview Secondary respectively. In 1998, Lakeview made world news when United States President Bill Clinton landed in a helicopter on the school's compound for discussions with Ugandan President Museveni. A third parish opened in 1994 at Kyrausozi.

In the new millennium the first [East] African district superior of Holy Cross was named in 2003. This was a step towards congregational and district maturity as the past nine superiors had been Americans.

Holy Cross educational institutions

Higher education

 University of Notre Dame, Notre Dame, Indiana (1842)
 Saint Mary's College, Notre Dame, Indiana (1844) (Sisters of the Holy Cross)
 St. Edward's University, Austin, Texas (1878)
 St. Joseph College, St. Joseph, New Brunswick Canada (1864)
 University of Portland, Portland, Oregon (1901)
 University of Holy Cross, New Orleans, Louisiana (1916) (Marianites of Holy Cross)
 King's College, Wilkes-Barre, Pennsylvania (1946)
 Stonehill College, Easton, Massachusetts (1948)
 Notre Dame College, Dhaka, Bangladesh (1949)
 Holy Cross College, Notre Dame, Indiana (1966) (Brothers of Holy Cross)
 Holy Cross College, Agartala, India (2009)
 Notre Dame University Bangladesh, Dhaka, Bangladesh (2013)

Secondary schools

Bangladesh
 Saint Placid's High School, Chittagong, Bangladesh (1853)
 St. Gregory's High School, Dhaka, Bangladesh (1881)
 Holy Cross High School, Dhaka, Bangladesh (1912)
 Saint Nicholas High School, Nagori, Bangladesh (1920)
 Biroidakuni High School, Mymensingh, Bangladesh (1941)
 Brother Andre High School, Noakhali, Bangladesh (1940)
 Mariam Ashram High School, Chittagong, Bangladesh (1946)
 Notre Dame College, Dhaka, Bangladesh (1949)
 Holy Cross College (Dhaka), Dhaka, Bangladesh (1950) (Sisters of the Holy Cross)
 Holy Cross Girls' High School, Dhaka, Bangladesh (1950) (Sisters of the Holy Cross)
 Udayan High School, Barisal, Bangladesh (1952)
 Saint Joseph Higher Secondary School, Dhaka, Bangladesh (1954)
 St. Joseph School of Industrial Trades, Dhaka, Bangladesh (1954)

Brazil
 Colegio Santa Maria, São Paulo, Brazil (1947) (Sisters of Holy Cross)
 Colegio Dom Amando, Santarém, Brazil (1966)
 Colegio Notre Dame, Campinas, Brazil (1961)
 Colegio Santa Cruz, São Paulo, Brazil

Canada
 Collège Notre-Dame du Sacré-Coeur (Montreal), Montreal, Quebec, Canada (1869)
 Notre Dame College School (Welland), Welland, Ontario, Canada
 Holy Cross Catholic Secondary School (St. Catharines, Ontario)
 Saint Joseph's Oratory, Montreal, Quebec, Canada

Chile
 St. George's College, Santiago, Chile (1943)
 Colegio de Nuestra Senora de Andacollo, (Santiago), Santiago, Chile (1976)

France
 Saint-Michel de Picpus, Paris. France
 Notre Dame d'Orveau Ecole, Nyoiseau, France
 Institution Notre-Dame de Sainte-Croix, Neuilly-sur-Seine (independent since 1903)

Ghana
 St. Augustine's College (Ghana), Cape Coast, Ghana
 St John's Secondary School, Sekondi Takoradi, Ghana

Haiti
 Collège Notre-Dame, Cap Haitian, Haiti (1904)
 École Père Pérard, Plaisance, Haiti
 École Père Joseph Lepévédic, Limbé, Haiti

India
 Holy Cross Matriculation Higher Secondary School , Salem, Tamil Nadu, India (1963)
 Notre Dame of Holy Cross School [CBSE ], Gundukallur, Salem, Tamil Nadu, India. [2008]
 Holy Cross International School [CBSE], Salem, Tamil Nadu, India (2021)
 Holy Cross School, Whitefield, Bangalore, India
 Holy Cross School, Agartala, Tripura India (1970)(CISCE)
 Holy Cross School, Tuikarmaw, Tripura (TBSE)
 Holy Cross School, Katalcherra, Tripura (TBSE)
 Holy Cross School, Panisagar, Tripura (TBSE)
 Holy Cross School, Kumarghat, Tripura (TBSE)
 Notredame Holy Cross School, Moharpara, Tripura (TBSE)
 St. Andre English Medium School, Bodhjungnagar, Tripura (CBSE)
 Good Shepherd School, Jongksha, Meghalaya (MBOSE)
 Holy Cross School, Umkiang, Meghalaya (MBOSE)
 Holy Cross School, Mawkynrew, Meghalaya (MBOSE)
 Jeevan Jyothi Technical Institute, Honavar, India
 Holy Cross School, Mizoram, India
 Holy Cross School, Trichy, TN (2002)
 Holy Cross School, Aymanam, Kerala (2003)
 Holy Cross School, Ghanpur, AP (2003)
 St Louis School, Dahisar, Mumbai (2002)
 Abhayadhama, Human Development Centre, Whitefield, Bangalore, Karnataka State (1976)
 Holy Cross School, Ballia, U.P, India

Liberia
St. Patrick's High School (Liberia)

Uganda
 Holy Cross Lake View Senior Secondary School (Wanyange), Jinja District (1993)

United States
 Holy Cross High School, New Orleans, Louisiana (1849)
 Academy of the Holy Cross, Kensington, Maryland (1868) (Sisters of the Holy Cross)
 Holy Trinity High School, Chicago, Illinois (1910)
 Cathedral High School (Indianapolis), Indianapolis, Ind. (1918–1972; 2011 reaffiliated)
 Notre Dame High School, West Haven, Connecticut (1946)
 Gilmour Academy, Gates Mills, Ohio (1946)
 Notre Dame High School, Sherman Oaks, California (1947)
 St. Edward High School, Lakewood, Ohio, (1949)
 Holy Family High School, Port Allen, Louisiana (1949) (Marianites of Holy Cross)
 Archbishop Hoban High School, Akron, Ohio (1953)
 St. Francis High School, Mountain View, California (1955)
 Notre Dame High School, Fairfield, Connecticut (1955)
 Notre Dame College Preparatory, Niles, Illinois (1955)
 Holy Cross High School, Flushing, New York (1955)
 Holy Cross of San Antonio, San Antonio, Texas (1957)
 St. Edmond's Academy, Wilmington, Delaware (1959)
 Bishop McNamara High School, Forestville, Maryland, (1964)
 Moreau Catholic High School, Hayward, California (1965)
 Holy Cross High School, Waterbury, Connecticut (1968)
 San Juan Diego Catholic High School, Austin, Texas (2019)

Primary schools

Uganda
 Holy Cross Primary School (Bugembe), Jinja District
 Saint Andrew's Primary School (Wanyange), Jinja District
 Saint Jude's Primary School, Jinja District

United States
 St. Edward High School, Lakewood, Ohio (1949)
 St. Ignatius Martyr, Austin, Texas (1940)
 Gilmour Academy, Gates Mills, Ohio (1946)
 Holy Cross School, New Orleans, Louisiana (1849)
 St. John Vianney School, Goodyear, Arizona (1992)
 St. Joseph Grade School, South Bend, Indiana (1854)
 Holy Cross School, South Bend, Indiana (1929)
 St. Adalbert Catholic School, South Bend, Indiana
 Christ the King Catholic School, South Bend, Indiana (1953)
 Holy Redeemer Catholic School, Portland, Oregon (1908)

Parishes

Bangladesh
 Holy Cross Church, Luxmibazar, Dhaka
 Church of St. Augustine of Hippo, Mathbari
 St. Joseph Church, Srimangal
 Our Lady of Holy Rosary Cathedral, Chittagong
 Fatima Rani Church, Bandarban
 Shanti Raj Girja Catholic Church, Thanchi
 Church of the Sacred Heart, Gournadi
 Sacred Heart of Jesus Church, Khalibpur
 Corpus Christi Church, Jalchatra
 St. Paul's Church, Pirgacha
 St. George's Church, Mariamnagar

Brazil
 Paroquia São José do Jaguaré, São Paulo, SP
 Paroquia São Felipe Apostolo, Maua, SP

Canada
 St. Kevin's Church, Welland, ON
 Holy Name Parish, Toronto, ON
 Our Lady of Perpetual Help Parish, Sherwood Park, AB
 St. Ann Parish, Toronto, ON
 Unité pastorale de Saint-Laurent, Saint-Laurent, QC
 Unité pastorale du Saint-Esprit, Cap-Pelé, NB
 Saint-Gregoire-le-Grand, Mont Saint-Gregoire, QC
 Notre-Dame-des-Champs, Saint-Polycarp, QC
 Saint-Martin de Val-Bélair, Québec, QC

Chile
 Parroquia San Roque, Santiago (1949)
 Parroquia Nuestra Señora de Andacollo, Santiago (1977)
 Parroquia Nuestra Señora de la Merced, Calle Larga (1989)

France
 Paroisse Notre-Dame de Sainte-Croix, Le Mans

Haiti
 Sainte Rose de Lima, Pilate
 Saint Charles Borromée, Le Borgne
 Saint Albert Le Grande, Ravine Trompette, Pilate
 Sainte Marie Madeleine, Duchity
 Notre Dame de l’Esperance/ND du Mont Carmel, Magagnosse/Labadie
 Notre Dame de Guadalupe, Waney, Port-au-Prince
 Saint Jules, Petit Bourg du Borgne
 Paroisse Sainte Elizabeth, Caracol

India
 St. Joseph Church, Agartala, Tripura
 St. Andre Mission, Bodhjunagar, Tripura
 Good Shepherd Church, Kathalcherra, Tripura
 St. Paul's Catholic Church, Kumarghat, Tripura
 Immaculate Conception Church, Moharpara, Tripura
 St. Mary's Church, Tuikarmaw, Tripura
 Holy Cross Parish, Bagbasa, Tripura
 Good Shepherd Parish, Jongksha, Meghalaya
 Holy Cross Parish, Mawkynrew, Meghalaya
 Holy Cross Parish, Umkiang, Meghalaya
 Holy Cross Church, Champhai, Mizoram
 St. John Parish, Khawzawl, Mizoram
 Holy Cross Parish, Koloriang, Arunachal Pradesh
 St. Sebastian Church, Loliem, Goa
St Vincent De Paul Church, Katapady, Karnataka
 Nirmal Matha Church, Abadi Ghanpur, Andhra Pradesh
 Christ the King Parish, Pune, Maharashtra
 St. Joseph Church, Chengalam, Kottayam, Kerala
 St. Louis Parish Centre, Dahisar, Mumbai, Maharashtra
 Sts. Peter and Paul Church, Dindigal, Tamil Nadu
 St. Sebastian Church, Idukki, Kerala

Kenya
 Holy Cross Parish Community, Dandora, Nairobi

Mexico
 Parroquia Nuestra Madre de la Luz, Monterrey, Nuevo León (1996)
 Parroquia San José, Tamán, San Luis Potosí (2011)

Peru
 Parroquia El Señor de la Esperanza, Canto Grande, Lima

Tanzania
 St. Brendan Parish, Kitete

Uganda
 Holy Cross Parish Community, Bugembe, Jinja
 St. Jude Thaddeus Parish Community, Kyarusozi, Fort Portal

United States
 Christ the King Parish, South Bend, Indiana (1933)
 Holy Cross Parish (1929) and St. Stanislaus Parish (1899), South Bend, Indiana
 Holy Cross Parish, South Easton, Massachusetts (1967)
 Holy Redeemer Parish, Portland, Oregon (2002)
 Sacred Heart Parish, Colorado Springs, Colorado (1984) (Including Mission Parishes of Holy Rosary and Our Lady of Perpetual Help)
 Sacred Heart Parish, Notre Dame, Indiana (1842)
 Sacred Heart Saint Francis de Sales Parish, Bennington, Vermont (1854 & 1880)
 St. Adalbert Parish, South Bend (2003) and St. Casimir Parish, South Bend, Indiana (1897)
 St. Ignatius Martyr Parish, Austin, Texas (1938)
 St. John Vianney Parish, Goodyear, Arizona (1981)
 St. Joseph Parish, South Bend, Indiana (1853)
 St. André Bessette Parish, Portland, Oregon (2001)
 St. John the Evangelist Parish, Viera, Florida (2001)

Other
 Ave Maria Press
 Holy Cross Family Ministries
 Family Theater Productions
 Family Rosary Crusade

References

External links 
Official international website
The Brothers of Holy Cross official website
United States Province of Priests and Brothers (USA) official website
District of Chile
District of Peru
Midwest Province of Brothers
Province Canadienne de la Congrégation de Sainte-Croix
South-West Province of Brothers
District of Brazil
Province of South India
Vicariate of France
Catholic Encyclopedia article on the Congregation

Books and publications
Gift of the Cross Lenten Reflections in the Holy Cross Tradition
The Cross, Our Only Hope; Catholic Bestseller available from Ave Maria Press
Basil Moreau; biography available from Ave Maria Press
Vincent McCauley, C.S.C.:Bishop of the Poor, Apostle of East Africa; biography available from Ave Maria Press

 
Holy Cross
 Congregation of Holy Cross
Religious organizations established in 1837
Catholic religious institutes established in the 19th century
Notre Dame, Indiana
1837 establishments in France